Jason Starkey (born July 15, 1977) is a former American football center. He was signed by the Arizona Cardinals as an undrafted free agent in 2000 and played his entire career with the Cardinals. He played college football at Marshall.

After his retirement from the NFL, Starkey was the head football coach at Lopez High School in Brownsville, Texas until his resignation in  2018.

References

1977 births
Living people
American football centers
Arizona Cardinals players
High school football coaches in Texas
Marshall Thundering Herd football players
People from Barboursville, West Virginia
Players of American football from West Virginia